Melanie Maurer (born 17 June 1988) is a Swiss professional racing cyclist, and duathlete, who currently rides for UCI Women's Continental Team . In 2018 and 2019, Maurer finished runner-up in both the World Long Distance and European Middle Distance Duathlon Championships. She rode in the women's road race event at the 2020 UCI Road World Championships.

Personal life
Outside of sport, Maurer works as a sports therapist.

References

External links
 

1988 births
Living people
Swiss female cyclists
Swiss female triathletes
Duathletes
People from Willisau District
Sportspeople from the canton of Lucerne
21st-century Swiss women